Synandromyces is a genus of fungi in the family Laboulbeniaceae. The genus contain 10 species.

References

External links
Synandromyces at Index Fungorum

Laboulbeniomycetes